Brown Stockings may refer to various former baseball teams:
St. Louis Brown Stockings, now St. Louis Cardinals
Davenport Brown Stockings, now Quad Cities River Bandits
Worcester Brown Stockings, a.k.a. Worcester Worcesters